Events from the year 1990 in France.

Incumbents
 President: François Mitterrand 
 Prime Minister: Michel Rocard

Events
15 May – Launch of the Renault Clio supermini, which will eventually replace the Renault 5.
13 July – Loi Gayssot enacted, prohibiting Holocaust denial.
14 July – Jean-Michel Jarre performs Paris La Défense – Une Ville En Concert before a world record audience of 2.5 million people. 
December – Espace Euro Disney, an information hub on the under construction Euro Disney resort near Paris, is opened to the public.
1 December – Channel Tunnel workers from the United Kingdom and France meet 40 metres beneath the English Channel seabed.

Arts and literature

Sport
30 June – Tour de France begins.
8 July – French Grand Prix won by Alain Prost.
22 July – Tour de France ends, won by Greg LeMond of the United States.

Births
10 January – Richard Philippe, motor racing driver.
22 January – Alizé Cornet, tennis player.
15 February – Charles Pic, motor racing driver.
20 May – Adeline Canac, pair skater.
4 June – Tippi Degré, animal handler.
12 June – Jérôme Jarre, vine star.
12 August – Wissam Ben Yedder, footballer.
21 October – Maxime Vachier-Lagrave, chess grandmaster.
22 December – Jean-Baptiste Maunier, actor and singer.

Deaths

January to March
10 January – Juliet Berto, actress (b. 1947).
16 January – Robert Lamartine, soccer player (b. 1935).
17 January – Charles Hernu, politician and Minister (b. 1923).
5 February – Père Marie-Benoît, friar who helped smuggle Jews to safety from Nazi-occupied Southern France (b. 1895).
5 February – Joseph Mauclair, cyclist (b. 1906).
15 February – Michel Drach, film director, writer, producer and actor (b. 1930).
7 March – Claude Arrieu, composer (b. 1903).
12 March – Philippe Soupault, poet, novelist, critic and political activist (b. 1897).
17 March – Capucine, actress (b. 1928).
20 March – Maurice Cloche, film director, screenwriter and film producer (b. 1907).

April to June
21 April – Romain de Tirtoff, artist and designer (b. 1892).
30 June – Jacques Lob, comic book creator (b. 1932).

July to September
18 July – Yves Chaland, cartoonist (b. 1957).
23 July – Pierre Gandon, illustrator and engraver of postage stamps (b. 1899).
25 July – Jean Fourastié, economist (b. 1907).
1 August – Michel Arnaud, General (b. 1915).
6 August – Jacques Soustelle, anthropologist (b. 1912).
15 August – Louis Vola, double bass player (b. 1902).
20 August – Maurice Gendron, cellist and teacher (b. 1920).
30 September – Michel Leiris, surrealist writer and ethnographer (b. 1901).

October to December
20 October – Colette Audry, novelist, screenwriter and critic (b. 1906).
22 October – Louis Althusser, Marxist philosopher (b. 1918).
27 October – Jacques Demy, film director (b. 1931).
October – Alfred Sauvy, demographer, anthropologist and historian (b. 1898).
5 November – Raymond Oliver, chef and restaurateur (b. 1909).
17 November – Pierre Braunberger, producer and actor (b. 1905).
1 December – Simone Melchior, wife and business partner of Jacques-Yves Cousteau (b. 1919).
18 December – Paul Tortelier, cellist and composer (b. 1914).
19 December – Edmond Delfour, international soccer player, manager (b. 1907).
23 December – Serge Danot, animator (b. 1931).
23 December – Pierre Gripari, writer (b. 1925).

Full date unknown
Jacques-Laurent Bost, journalist (b. 1916).
Daniel du Janerand, painter (b. 1919).
Marcel Légaut, philosopher and mathematician (b. 1900).
Claude Ponsard, economist (b. 1927).

See also
 List of French films of 1990

References

1990s in France